The Dartmouth Big Green women's basketball team is the intercollegiate women's basketball program representing Dartmouth College. The school competes in the Ivy League in Division I of the National Collegiate Athletic Association (NCAA). The Big Green play home basketball games at the Leede Arena near the campus.

History
As of the 2015–16 season, the Big Green have a 571–506 record, with a 326–189 record in the Ivy League. They have won the Ivy League 17 times (1980, 1981, 1982, 1983, 1986, 1987, 1988, 1989, 1990, 1994, 1995, 1999, 2000, 2005, 2006, 2008, and 2009). Dartmouth is 5–2 in playoffs to determine the automatic bid to the NCAA Tournament, winning 66–49 over Princeton in 1999, beating Harvard 75–61 in 2005, beating Brown 73–62 and Princeton 63–48 and winning over Harvard 68–62 in the first game of a three-way tie in 2008 while losing to Brown 72–62 in 1994 and losing to Cornell 64–47 in 2008 in the final game. The Big Green have reached the NCAA Tournament seven times (1983, 1995, 1999, 2000, 2005, 2006, and 2009), though they have lost each time. 

Source:

Postseason appearances
In seven NCAA Tournament appearances, the Big Green are 0–7.

NCAA Division I Tournament appearances

WNIT appearances
The Big Green are 0–2 in WNIT appearances.

References

External links